is a Japanese volleyball player who plays for JT Marvelous. She also plays for the All-Japan women's volleyball team.

Nakamura played for the All-Japan team for the first time at the Montreux Volley Masters in May 2013.

Clubs
  Sawa Junior High
  Seiei Highschool
  Nippon Sport Science University (2009-2013)
  JT Marvelous (2013-)

Awards

Individuals
2012 All Japan Intercollegiate Volleyball Championship - Server award

Clubs
2008 Domestic Sports Festival (Highschool category) -  Champion, with Seiei Highschool.
2011 Volleyball at the 2011 Summer Universiade - 4th place, with Japanese Universiade team.
2012 All Japan Intercollegiate Volleyball Championship -  Runner-Up, with Nippon Sport Science University.

References

External links
 V.League - Profile
 JT Marvelous - Profile

Japanese women's volleyball players
Living people
1990 births
Sportspeople from Fukuoka Prefecture